Club Deportivo Vigo Futbol Sala was a futsal club based in Vigo, Spain.

The club was founded in 1991 and its stadium is the ground As Travesas with capacity of 6,500 seats.

The club was sponsored by Cometal.

The club disappeared in 2007 due to not finding economic viability.

History
The club was founded in 1991. For the season 2005–06, the club competed in Primera Nacional A, but at end of the season bought the seat of Barcel Euro Puebla (founded in 1995), who played in Láncara, (a parish of Lugo), moving the club to Vigo city. In December 2005, Celta de Vigo became an official sponsor. Celta de Vigo was not the owner, but merely a sponsor.

For the season 2006–07, the club competed with Cometal Celta de Vigo name.

In June 2007, the club was relegated two divisions, from División de Honor to Primera Nacional A due to serious economic problems. Currently, as 2009, the status of club is dubious. Some news report that was dissolved in 2008.

Season to season

1 seasons in División de Honor
6 seasons in División de Plata
6 season in 1ª Nacional A
3 season in 1ª Nacional B

Notable players
 Ari Santos

References

External links
Profile at LNFS.es

RC Celta de Vigo
Futsal clubs in Galicia (Spain)
Futsal clubs established in 1991
Sports clubs disestablished in 2008
1991 establishments in Spain
2008 disestablishments in Spain
Sport in Vigo